2033 also billed as 2033: Future Apocalypse (in Spanish as 2033 and 2033: La Ilusion de un Futuro Mejor) is a Mexican film that premiered on 24 September 2009 at the Fantastisk Film Festival Lund, Sweden).  It was the directorial debut for the director, Francisco Laresgoiti. Regarding the title, Laresgotiti said that he "initially call it VCR 2026, (Viva Cristo Rey 2026), the motto of the Cristeros, as this would define the ideology of the tape, but decided to use 2033 as this will be the two thousandth anniversary the death of Jesus Christ." The film was intended to be a trilogy, but the two sequels had not been written as of 2008.

Synopsis
The film is set in the year 2033 in a dystopian view of the future, in the Mexico City which by that time has been renamed Villaparaiso (Paradise City).  The totalitarian militaristic/corporate government has outlawed the freedom of expression and religion in general.  The government maintains control through pharmaceutical additions to the food and drink supply, which at the same time includes toxic chemicals.

The protagonist is Lozada a lawyer whose true identity is "Father Miguel", the leader of a revolutionary movement. He is a priest of a religion that is a fusion of many religions, the focus in the film is a kind of theology of freedom; he is also a leader of the revolutionary movement that wants to free people from the government.  He befriends Pablo, a rich and pampered man who believed that he was orphaned, who is in the leadership program of the military government. Lozada informs him that his father is actually a prisoner of the government.  After hearing this, Pablo joins the organization to rescue his father and overthrow the government.

Reviews
Reviews for the film were mixed.  Newcity recommended the film while rating it a "B−" Time Out Chicago reviewer Kevin B. Lee called the film "A dystopian Mexican thriller emphasizes mood at the expense of character" and that "the screenplay’s political provocations collapse into generic telenovela suspense."

Releases
24 September 2009 – Fantastisk Film Festival, Lund, Sweden (premiere)
5 February 2010 – Mexico
1 May 2010 – Sci-Fi-London Film Festival

Cast
Miguel Couturier 	... Stam
Sandra Echeverría 	... Lucía
Alonso Echánove 	... Pec
Luis Ernesto Franco 	... Milo
Genaro Hernandez 	... Ing. de camaras
Claudio Lafarga 	... Pablo
Raúl Méndez 		... Goros
Marco Antonio Treviño 	... Lozado/ Padre Miguel

References

External links

http://correcamara.com.mx/index.php?mod=peliculas_detalle&pelid=1600

2009 films
2000s Spanish-language films
2000s science fiction adventure films
2000s science fiction thriller films
Mexican thriller films
2000s dystopian films
Films set in 2033
Films set in Mexico City
2000s Mexican films